Grange railway station may refer to:
Australia
Grange railway station, Adelaide
England
Grange-over-Sands railway station
Grange Lane railway station (Sheffield)
Grange Park railway station
Scotland
Grange railway station (Scotland)